Walter Hartley 'Wal' Phillips (17 October 1908 in Tottenham, England – 1998) was an international motorcycle speedway rider who rode in the first ever World Championship final in 1936.

Career summary 
Phillips began his speedway career alongside Gus Kuhn at Stamford Bridge Pensioners in 1929, winning the Southern League Championship, and stayed there until they closed at the end of the 1932 season, where he also appeared in the final of the Star Riders' Championship . Philips then joined the Wimbledon Dons, staying there until the end of the 1936 season. 

Phillips represented England from 1930 until 1936. His career was ended on the 1936/37 tour of Australia when he suffered a broken leg at the Sydney Showground.

World Final appearances 
 1936 -  London, Wembley Stadium - 13th - 5pts + 7 semi-final points

Engineering
Phillips was a renowned engineer, his uncle was a development engineer and works rider at JA Prestwich Industries Ltd (JAP), and was instrumental in the development of the JAP engines used in speedway. Stan Greening was developing an engine specifically for speedway but the results were not impressive after testing by Australian riders Billy Lamont and Vic Huxley. Greening and Phillips stripped down Phillips' Rudge bike and used some of the ideas in that engine with the new one of their own. When Phillips rode the bike at a meeting at Stamford Bridge stadium he beat the track record time. The JAP engines remained in use until the mid-1960s.

Phillips was also known for what he termed as his fuel injector, a carburettor replacement mainly intended for motorcycles and scooters.

References

External links
 Wal Phillips
 Wal Phillips Fuel injector
 JAP origins
 Picture of Wal Phillips fuel injector

1908 births
1998 deaths
British speedway riders
Wimbledon Dons riders
People from Tottenham